Barrier Canyon Style (BCS) describes a distinctive style of rock art which appears mostly in Utah, with the largest concentration of sites in and around the San Rafael Swell and Canyonlands National Park, but the full range extends into much of the state and western Colorado.  The term was first applied by Polly Schaafsma (The Rock Art of Utah, 1971) to describe a handful of similar sites known at the time, including several along Barrier Creek in Horseshoe Canyon (formerly known as Barrier Canyon).  Barrier Canyon Style rock art panels are mostly pictographs (painted) but there are also several petroglyphs (pecked)  in the style.  These panels are believed to have been created during the archaic period (probably late archaic) and are estimated (from direct and indirect carbon 14 dates) to be somewhere in the range of 1500 to 4000 years old, possibly older -- clay figurines of a similar style found in Cowboy Cave (in a tributary canyon to Horseshoe Canyon) have been dated to over 7000 years old.

Sites

 Horseshoe Canyon
 Buckhorn Draw Pictograph Panel
 Courthouse Wash Pictographs in Arches National Park
 Sego Canyon

References

 Traces of a Lost People, By Kurt Repanshek, Smithsonian magazine, March 2005
 Canyonlands National Park - Archeology of Horseshoe Canyon, National Park Service
 Barrier Canyon Style Rock Art Gallery and Singing Desert Barrier Canyon Style pages, photos of Barrier Canyon Style rock art by Doak Heyser.

Rock art in North America
Petroglyphs in Utah